Pablo Figueroa Carillo  (born October 27, 1981) is male judoka from Puerto Rico. He competed at the 2008 Summer Olympics

References 

 
 Facebook

1981 births
Living people
Puerto Rican male judoka
Judoka at the 2008 Summer Olympics
Judoka at the 2011 Pan American Games
Olympic judoka of Puerto Rico
Pan American Games medalists in judo
Pan American Games bronze medalists for Puerto Rico
20th-century Puerto Rican people
21st-century Puerto Rican people